Neoachiropsetta milfordi, the armless flounder or finless flounder, is a species of southern flounder, the only member of  the genus Neoachiropsetta.

References

 
 Tony Ayling & Geoffrey Cox, Collins Guide to the Sea Fishes of New Zealand,  (William Collins Publishers Ltd, Auckland, New Zealand 1982) 

Achiropsettidae
Fish described in 1965